The Huxley River is in the South Island of New Zealand. It feeds into the Hopkins River which in turn feeds into Lake Ōhau.

History 
The first Pākeha to explore the valley was Julius Von Haast. The valley was named after the biologist Thomas Henry Huxley. The Huxley valley previously had the Māori name  (sometimes given as ), meaning 'stake' or 'peg'. The northern branch of the valley contains Brodrick Pass, called in Māori , meaning ‘a thief who steals without qualms or care for the thoughts of others’. This pass was incredibly important for traversing the South Island, and was in heavy use in the old days, due to the fact that it is a easy ascent from both the Landsborough side and the Huxley side.

References

External links
Department of Conservation - Mackenzie Basin tramping tracks

Rivers of Canterbury, New Zealand
Rivers of New Zealand